The Botanischer Garten der Nationalpark Bayerischer Wald is a botanical garden located adjacent to the Hans-Eisenmann-Haus visitor center in the Nationalpark Bayerischer Wald at Böhmstraße 35, Neuschönau, Bavaria, Germany. The garden contains over 700 plant species found in the Bavarian Forest, in habitats ranging from meadows, slopes, and rock fields, to springs, ponds, and bogs. It also includes geological displays.

See also 
 List of botanical gardens in Germany

External links 
 Nationalpark Bayerischer Wald: Lusen Visitor Center
 BGCI entry

Nationalpark Bayerischer Wald, Botanischer Garten der
Nationalpark Bayerischer Wald, Botanischer Garten der